Transamerica Tower (colloquially known by its most recent former label, the Legg Mason Building) and originally built as the USF&G Building, serving as headquarters of the United States Fidelity and Guarantee Company, a specialized insurance company founded in Baltimore in 1896, and relocated here from its former complex of three adjoining early 20th Century masonry structures at the southwest corner of South Calvert and Redwood (formerly German Street before World War I) Streets. Later occupied by and known as the Legg-Mason Building, it is a 40-story,  skyscraper completed in 1973 in downtown Baltimore, Maryland at 100 Light Street (postal address) on the city block bounded by South Charles (Maryland Route 139), East Lombard, Light and East Pratt Streets, facing the former "The Basin" of the Helen Delich Bentley Port of Baltimore on the Northwest Branch of the Patapsco River and the newly iconic Inner Harbor downtown business waterfront redevelopment of the 1970s–1980s. It is the tallest building in Baltimore and in Maryland.

History
It was one of the first skyscrapers to be constructed using a then-revolutionary method of erecting a towering central reinforced concrete column first containing elevators and service infrastructure conduits and then followed later by the surrounding scaffolding or steel horizontal beams rising floor by floor, and was a magnet for "sidewalk superintendents" and passing office workers during its construction during the early 70's. Overlooking the new harborfront parkland and expanded bulkheads of former Sam Smith Park with newly rebuilt/repaved Light and Pratt Streets with median strips and landscaped tree-lined sidewalks focused on a brick waterside promenade, soon to be anchored by the historic sailing U.S. Navy warship,  (originally thought to be from 1797, later documented as 1854) with "Constellation Dock" replacing old Municipal Pier 1. Later surrounded by an enormous surrounding plazas rising above a series of steps on the lower south and east sides of the block paved with pink stone panels with terraced garden plots with shrubbery at the edges. A few years later, the construction of Harborplace shopping pavilions with a new waterfall fountain in renamed McKeldin Square (renamed for former Mayor and Governor Theodore R. McKeldin), reached by crossing-over the adjacent streets by pedestrian bridges and a central amphitheater facing the water and the ships. Within a decade, the new tower was surrounded by additional glass and aluminum office buildings, hotels, and shopping/commercial high-rises.

Construction of the new rising tower challenged for the first time forty years the "tallest tower" ranking held since its 1929 completion of the art deco-styled former Baltimore Trust Company Tower, (which later went bankrupt shortly after its completion after the Great Wall Street Stock Market Crash of October 1929), then assumed several other names before bearing the title of the Maryland National Bank of the reorganized old B.T.C., by the 1960s soon the largest banking chain in the state.

Despite its own changes of owners and names, the former U.S.F. & G. Building remains the tallest building in Baltimore, the tallest building in Maryland, and the tallest building between Philadelphia and Raleigh after the completion of RBC Plaza in 2008. It was also the former home of Legg Mason investment and financial advisors who later relocated to newer quarters on the eastern side of the downtown in Harbor East.

USF&G built the 35-story tower, selling it when they were purchased by the St. Paul Companies, which is now a unit of The Travelers Companies. The building was renamed the Transamerica Tower in November 2011 when Transamerica became the largest tenant of the building, moving there from its nationally known former headquarters in San Francisco, the iconic landmark Transamerica Pyramid which appears at the top of the building in the company's logo. The building was again put on sale in early 2015.

Occupants and ownership changes 
USF&G remained in the building until the mid-1990s. The building's primary occupant was asset manager Legg Mason, Inc., until 2009. In February 2007, Legg Mason announced that it would be moving to a new skyscraper in the Harbor East southeastern waterfront development, a move that was completed during summer 2009. As of 2010, the "Legg Mason" sign was no longer at the top of the Pratt and Light Streets building.

In 2009 the building became home to the Baltimore branch of RBC Wealth Management.

In spring 2011, the building also became home to Baltimore-based law firm Ober|Kaler (now Baker Donelson). The firm occupies 6 floors of the building.

In November 2011, the building became the headquarters of Transamerica.

In April 2013, the building became the home of the Mid-Atlantic law firm Miles & Stockbridge P.C.

Around 1978, a peregrine falcon made its home on a balcony on the building's 33rd floor.  Every year since then, a pair of falcons have returned to the building to nest and fledge a set of chicks.

See also
List of tallest buildings in Baltimore
List of tallest buildings by U.S. state and territory
Baltimore
History of Baltimore
Timeline of Baltimore history
Charles Center
Inner Harbor
USF&G

References

External links

100 Light Street Website

Chesapeake Conservancy Peregrine Falcon Cam

Downtown Baltimore
Skyscraper office buildings in Baltimore
Office buildings completed in 1973
Insurance company headquarters in the United States
1973 establishments in Maryland